Vatche and Tamar Manoukian is a manuscript library (Matenadaran) located in Vagharshapat, Armenia.

See also
 Armenian Apostolic Church

References

External links 
 

Buildings and structures in Vagharshapat
Libraries in Armenia